Never Alone is the first studio album by Seth & Nirva released on May 27, 2016 on Integrity Music.

Critical reception

Awarding the album four stars at CCM Magazine, Matt Conner describes, "the married couple have committed to fusing an already expansive musical palette with the release of their new full-length album, Never Alone. The group infuses gospel, dance, slight R&B and even funk flavors into familiar pop structures that should earn then significant attention at radio with enjoyable songs...If it sounds like a diverse offering, it’s because it is. There’s a lot to like here on Seth & Nirva’s debut LP." Bersain Beristain, rating the album three and a half stars from Jesus Freak Hideout, writes, "Diversity is by far the most attractive characteristic belonging to Never Alone, but unfortunately, the songs presented to us don't explore past the boundaries that CCM-heavyweights have already laid before them. Seth and Nirva do make a fine home within the nest though, and sometimes a comfortable evening with the familiar is all we really desire." Giving the album four and a half stars by Today's Christian Entertainment, Kelly Meade states, "From start to finish, Never Alone is a journey of beautifully crafted lyrics set to an eclectic musical blend making for a listening experience that is both inspiring and eye opening reminding us of the amazing love of God and our purpose to reflect that love as we point people to Him." Jonathan Andre, indicating in a four star review by 365 Days of Inspiring Media, says, "Well done to both Seth and Nirva for delivering to us an enjoyable and heartfelt album of devotion and praise!"

Track listing

Charts

References

2016 debut albums